Carella is a surname. Notable people with the surname include:

C. J. Carella, RPG maker and novelist
Emmanuel Carella (born 1982), Australian singer 
Steve Carella, Detective in the American television show 87th Precinct
Enzo Carella (1952–2017), Italian singer